Wilson Heights may refer to:

 Wilson Heights (electoral district), a former provincial electoral district in Ontario, Canada
 Wilson Heights, Toronto, a neighbourhood in Toronto